Ivo Banella (born 29 September 1953 in Castiglione del Lago) is a retired Italian football player.

His debut professional game in the 1971/72 season for A.S. Roma remained his only Serie A game.

References

External links

1953 births
Living people
Italian footballers
Serie A players
A.S. Roma players
A.C. Legnano players
A.S.D. Gallipoli Football 1909 players
Association football forwards
People from Castiglione del Lago
Footballers from Umbria
Sportspeople from the Province of Perugia